The 2023 Monmouth Hawks football team will represent the Monmouth University during the 2023 NCAA Division I FCS football season. The Hawks play their home games at the Kessler Stadium in West Long Branch, New Jersey. The team is coached by 31st-year head coach Kevin Callahan.

Previous season

The Hawks finished the 2022 season with an overall record of 5–6, 3–5 CAA play to finish in ninth place.

Schedule

References

Monmouth Hawks
Monmouth Hawks football seasons
Monmouth Hawks football